Matthieu Lagrive (born 7 December 1979) is a French motorcycle racer. He races in the International Road Race Championship, aboard a Yamaha YZF-R6.

Accomplishments

 1994: Competition debut
 1996:
 Winner of the Cagiva Cup
 3rd place in the Promosport 125cc
 1997:
 Selected for the French motorcycle team Vitesse Espoir
 3rd place in the France 250cc Championship (Honda RS)
 12th place in the Europe 250cc Championship
 1998:
 4th place in the France 250cc Championship 
 Participated in five 250cc Grand Prix for Team Tech 3 (Honda RS)
 2000:
 Winner of the "Coupe BMW Boxer Cup" at Magny-Cours
 Participated in the 600cc Supersport Championships of France and Europe
 2001:
 2nd place in the 600cc France Supersport Championship (Yamaha R6)
 4th place in the 600cc Europe Supersport Championship (Yamaha R6)
 3rd place in the Spa 24 Hours (Yamaha R7)
 2002:
 21st place in the Supersport World Championship (Team Yamaha SAVEKO)
 3rd place in the 24 Hours of Le Mans  (Yamaha R7)
 2003:
 16th place in the Supersport World Championship (Team Yamaha Motor France)
 2nd place in the Bol d'Or (Yamaha R7)
 2004:
 14th place in the Supersport World Championship (Team Suzuki Moto 1)
 2nd place in the FIM Endurance World Championship (Suzuki Endurance Racing Team)
 Winner of the Bol d'Or (Suzuki Endurance Racing Team)
 2005:
 Winner of the FIM Endurance World Championship (Suzuki Endurance Racing Team)
 Winner of France SUPERPRODUCTION (Junior Team Suzuki)
 Winner of the Bol d'Or (Suzuki Endurance Racing Team)
 2nd place in the 24 Hours of Le Mans (Suzuki Endurance Racing Team)
 2006:
 Winner of the FIM Endurance World Championship (Suzuki Endurance Racing Team)
 Winner of the Bol d'Or (Suzuki Endurance Racing Team)
 1st in the 24 Hours of Oschersleben (Suzuki Endurance Racing Team)
 Winner of the 500 km of Assen (Suzuki Endurance Racing Team)
 1st in the 8 Hours of Albacete (Suzuki Endurance Racing Team)
 1st in the 6 Hours of Zolder (Suzuki Endurance Racing Team)
 2nd in the 24 Hours of Le Mans (Suzuki Endurance Racing Team)
 38th in the 8 Hours of Suzuka (Suzuki Endurance Racing Team)
 2007:
 2nd in the 24 Hours of Le Mans (Suzuki Endurance Racing Team)
 2nd in the 6 Hours of Albacete (Suzuki Endurance Racing Team)
 2nd in the Bol d'Or (Suzuki Endurance Racing Team)
 Winner of the FIM Endurance World Championship (Suzuki Endurance Racing Team)
 2008:
 Pole position in the World Supersport at Brands Hatch (Honda CBR 600RR)
 Pole position in the World Supersport at Donington (Honda CBR 600RR)
 2nd in the 6 Hours of Albacete
 Winner of the Bol d'Or (Suzuki Endurance Racing Team)
 2nd in the 24 Hours of Le Mans (Suzuki Endurance Racing Team)
 Winner of the FIM Endurance World Championship (Suzuki Endurance Racing Team)

Career statistics

Grand Prix motorcycle racing

Races by year
(key) (Races in bold indicate pole position) (Races in italics indicate fastest lap)

Supersport World Championship

Races by year
(key) (Races in bold indicate pole position) (Races in italics indicate fastest lap)

Superbike World Championship

Races by year
(key) (Races in bold indicate pole position) (Races in italics indicate fastest lap)

References

External links

Profile on MotoGP.com
Profile on WorldSBK.com

Living people
1979 births
French motorcycle racers
250cc World Championship riders
Supersport World Championship riders
Superbike World Championship riders